Michael Lumb may refer to:

Michael Lumb (cricketer) (born 1980), England international cricketer
Michael Lumb (footballer) (born 1988), Danish international footballer